The following is a list of the 59 communes of the Lyon Metropolis, France.

References

Metropolitan Lyon